Hidden Falls may refer to:

Places in the United States 
 Hidden Falls (Baranof Island, Alaska)
 Hidden Falls (Hanging Rock, North Carolina)
 Hidden Falls (Placer County, California)
 Hidden Falls (Saint Paul, Minnesota)
 Hidden Falls (Teton County, Wyoming)